Con Nicolopoulos (born October 17, 1961) is an American professional stock car racing driver. He currently competes part-time in the ARCA Menards Series, driving the No. 0 Chevrolet SS for Wayne Peterson Racing & No. 27 Chevrolet SS for Richmond Motorsports.

Racing career

ARCA Menards Series 
Nicolopoulos would first race in 2011, with Brad Smith Motorsports after meeting Chrysler coworker Brad Smith. He would first spot for Smith, then drive a second entry for Smith at certain races. Smith's second entry was a start-and-park entry, meaning that the team would pull in early every race. 

In 2014, Nicolopoulos would sign with Wayne Peterson Racing part-time, running a start-and-park entry for most of his races. Nicolopoulos would finish his first race in 2017 at Nashville Fairgrounds Speedway, finishing 26th. Since then, he has earned one top ten at Winchester Speedway, and has finished 17 of his 89 attempts in the ARCA Menards Series.

Personal life 
Nicolopoulos is an engineer for Chrysler in thermal dynamics. During the COVID-19 pandemic, he has also worked on developing new healthcare products.

Motorsports career results

ARCA Menards Series 
(key) (Bold – Pole position awarded by qualifying time. Italics – Pole position earned by points standings or practice time. * – Most laps led.)

ARCA Menards Series East

References

External links 
Con Nicolopoulos driver statistics at Racing-Reference

1961 births

Living people
ARCA Menards Series drivers
NASCAR drivers
Racing drivers from Michigan
People from St. Clair County, Michigan